Wofo Temple is a Buddhist temple located near the Beijing Botanical Garden  from the center of Beijing. The temple is the location of a recumbent Buddha sculpture, created in 1321.

History

The temple was first built in the 7th century and known as the Doulu temple. During the following centuries temple was destroyed and rebuilt numerous times while also undergoing name changes. The current incarnation dates from 1734. The temple's first recumbent Buddha was carved in sandstone. In 1321, during the Yuan dynasty the sandstone carving was replaced by a 5.2 meter long statue made of bronze and weighing 2.5 tons.

Layout

Following a north–south axis, the temple contains an entrance gate followed by three halls. On either side of the axis are buildings used by the monks for lodging as well as to accommodate guests. The first hall is called the Tianwang hall, the second the Sanshi Buddha hall, followed by the Recumbent Buddha hall.

Notes

References

Liao Pin and Wu Wen. The Temples of Beijing. Beijing: Foreign Languages Press, 2006.

Major National Historical and Cultural Sites in Beijing
Buddhist temples in Beijing